Daniel Adni (born 6 December 1951) is an Israeli classical pianist.

He began his training in Haifa, where he made his debut at age 12.  He studied with Vlado Perlemuter at the Paris Conservatory, winning the Premier Prix 3 times.  Afterwards he studied with Géza Anda in Zurich (1970).  In 1970 he made his London debut. He won the Young Concert Artists International Auditions (1976) and the Phillip M. Faucett Prize (1981).  He has toured throughout the world and played with the leading orchestras and conductors.

In 1999, he and Tessa Katzenellenbogen were married in London, England.

References
Nicolas Slonimsky, ed., Baker's Biographical Dictionary of 20th Century Classical Musicians, Ninth Edition, Schirmer Books, 1997
General Register Office. England & Wales, Marriage Index: 1984-2005 [database on-line]. Provo, UT, USA: The Generations Network, Inc., 2007. Original data: General Register Office. England and Wales Civil Registration Indexes. London, England: General Register Office. CD-ROM of the England and Wales, Civil Registration Indexes created by the General Register Office, in London, England.

Living people
1951 births
Israeli classical pianists
Jewish classical pianists
Musicians from Haifa